Dennett LeRoy Richardson (September 12, 1879 – September 6, 1946) was an American hospital administrator and college football player and coach. He served as the head football coach at Bates College in 1903, before embarking on a career in medicine. Richardson was a hospital superintendent in Rhode Island.

Richardson was born on September 12, 1879, in Newport, Maine, to Dr. Leroy Richardson and Mary (Coburn) Richardson. He attended public schools in Newport before moving on to Bates, where played football and basketball and was captain of the track team before graduating in 1900. Richardson earned a medical degree in 1905 from the University of Pennsylvania and played on the 1902 Penn Quakers football team.

Richardson was the superintendent for over 30 years at Charles V. Chapin Hospital in Providence, Rhode Island. In 1940, he took on the same role at Rhode Island Hospital, also in Providence. He died on September 6, 1946, in Providence.

References

1879 births
1946 deaths
19th-century players of American football
American football ends
American hospital administrators
Bates Bobcats football coaches
Bates Bobcats football players
Bates Bobcats men's basketball players
Bates Bobcats men's track and field athletes
Penn Quakers football players
Perelman School of Medicine at the University of Pennsylvania alumni
People from Newport, Maine
Coaches of American football from Maine
Players of American football from Maine
Basketball players from Maine
Track and field athletes from Maine